Electoral district of Goulburn was an electoral district of the Legislative Assembly in the Australian state of Victoria. It was preceded by the Electoral district of Goulburn Valley, which was abolished in 1945.

Members

Election results

References

Former electoral districts of Victoria (Australia)
1945 establishments in Australia
1955 disestablishments in Australia